The Excubitors ( or , , i.e. The 300-strong force, originally recruited from among the warlike mountain tribe of the Isaurians, replaced the older  as the main imperial bodyguard. The Excubitors remained an active military unit for the next two centuries, although, as imperial bodyguards, they did not often go on campaign. Their commander, the count of the Excubitors, soon acquired great influence. Justin I was able to use this position to rise to the throne in 518, and henceforth the counts of the Excubitors were among the main political power-holders of their day; two more, Tiberius II Constantine and Maurice, rose to become emperors in the late 6th century.

In the late 7th century, the Excubitors appear to have degenerated into a parade-ground formation, and fade from the record as a corps. Individual seals of office attest to the fact that title of  appears to have been used as an honorific dignity rather than an active military appointment during the early 8th century. Notable members of the regiment during this time are Saint Joannicius the Great, and Emperor Michael II the Amorian, who served as regimental commander, or domestic of the Excubitors, before rising to the throne. The Excubitors fought in several campaigns during the next four centuries, and are last attested in the disastrous Battle of Dyrrhachium in 1081 that destroyed the remnants of the middle Byzantine army.

History

Early period: Imperial bodyguard

The unit was headed by the count of the Excubitors, who was entirely independent of all other officials and subordinated only to the emperor himself. By virtue of his proximity to the emperor, the count of the Excubitors became an official of great importance in the 6th and 7th centuries. Thus it was the support of his men that secured Justin I, who held the post at the time of the death of Anastasius I, his elevation to the throne. Similarly, Justin II relied on the support of the Excubitors for his unchallenged accession; their count, Tiberius, was a close friend who had been appointed to the post through Justin's intervention. Tiberius was to be the Emperor's right-hand man throughout his reign, eventually succeeding him as Tiberius II. He too would be succeeded by his own  , Maurice. Under Maurice, the post was held by his brother-in-law Philippicus, and under Phocas by Priscus. Another powerful occupant was Valentinus, who secured it during the power struggles that accompanied the regency of Empress-dowager Martina in 641, before deposing her and her son Heraklonas and installing Constans II as emperor. Valentinus dominated the new regime, but his attempt to become emperor himself in 644 ended in his being lynched by the mob. 

Apart from their duties as commander of the Excubitors, holders of the office now also undertook other functions such as recruiting troops and interrogating suspected traitors. The count of the Excubitors was even sent to lead campaigns. The power that went with the position, and the intrigues of men like Priscus and the would-be usurper Valentinus, doomed the post to eventual decline during the latter half of the 7th century, although it is likely that the post continued in existence into the 8th century, until the corps was reorganized.

The participation of the Excubitors in campaigns is well attested, such as in 598, when Emperor Maurice took them to defend the Anastasian Wall against the Avars. They served with Heraclius against the Sasanian Persians, and  some Excubitors appear as guards to Pope Martin I. During the later 7th century, like the  before them, the Excubitors degenerated to a parade-ground unit that saw no active service. This is evidenced by a large number of seals naming individual  during this time, in stark contrast to the periods before and after, when the Excubitors are attested as an active military unit.

Later period: Elite regiment
The  were cavalry units, armed and equipped by the imperial arms factories to a higher standard than the provincial ('thematic') forces, likely including horse armour. As such the Excubitors were no longer a palace guard, but a unit actively engaged in military campaigns.

This initiated a purge of the new units from suspected opponents of the Emperor's policies. By the 780s, following years of imperial favour and military victories under Constantine V and his son Leo IV the Khazar, the  had become firm adherents to the iconoclast cause. Within less than two months of Leo V's death in 780, Empress-regent Irene of Athens had to foil an attempt spearheaded by the Domestic of the Excubitors to place Constantine V's exiled second son, Nikephoros, on the throne, and in 785/86 Irene forcibly disarmed them and exiled some 1,500 tagmatic soldiers due to their resistance to the restoration of the icons. 

The  and the Excubitors nevertheless continued to play an active political role in the events of the following decades: in 792, they attempted to overthrow Irene's son, Constantine VI, after the disastrous Battle of Marcellae against the Bulgars, and in 797, their support was crucial for Irene's overthrowing her own son and replacing him as sole ruler; and again, the two  were crucial in the deposition of Irene herself in 802. 

The Excubitors took part in the disastrous Pliska campaign in 811, when the Byzantine army was routed by Tsar Krum of Bulgaria; the Domestic of the Excubitors fell in the field along with the other senior Byzantine generals, including Emperor Nikephoros I himself. The most prominent domestic of the Excubitors of the period was Michael II the Amorian, whose supporters overthrew Emperor Leo V the Armenian and raised him to the throne. The regiment also fought at the battles of Boulgarophygon in 896 and Acheloos in 917, both heavy defeats against the Bulgarians. In the expedition against the Emirate of Crete in 949, the Byzantine force included a contingent of over 700 Excubitors. In 958, the Excubitors participated in the repulsion of a Magyar raid.

The Excubitors took part in the failed Azaz campaign of 1030, where they were ambushed and dispersed by the Mirdasids, while their commander, the  Leo Choirosphaktes, was taken captive. The Excubitors are last attested in Anna Komnene's Alexiad, where they are recorded as participating at the Battle of Dyrrhachium against the Italo-Normans in 1081, under the command of Constantine Opos.

Structure

Early period
The internal structure of the regiment during its first centuries is obscure. From their foundation and throughout the early period of their existence, the Excubitors numbered 300 men. Originally recruited exclusively from Isaurians, the unit was eventually opened up to other ethnicities, but it is unclear how the new recruits were chosen. Their arms and equipment are unknown, other than that they are recorded as carrying maces. Since they were a bodyguard unit intended to serve in the palace, they were most likely infantry.

The presence of officers called  in the corps has been controversial: John B. Bury and A. H. M. Jones both suggested that they were a separate, although possibly related, unit. The historian Warren Treadgold speculates that they fulfilled a role similar to the regular cavalry decurions, commanding troops of 30 men each, but the  also appear in charge of administrative matters such as handing out pay to the soldiers, as well as more sensitive tasks such as delivering letters, making arrests, and preparing expeditions.

Later period

Commander
The regimental commander, the domestic of the Excubitors (often also shortened to "the Excubitor"), is well attested in the various lists of offices in the 9th–10th centuries, where it is held in tandem with that of the chief of the "suburban" members of the racing faction of the Greens, which functioned as a militia for the defence of Constantinople, and of the regiment of the "Walls".

The Escorial Taktikon, written , records the existence of a "Domestic of the Excubitors of the East", and a "Domestic of the Excubitors of the West", as well as a subaltern "Domestic of the Excubitors". This has led to the suggestion that, probably under Romanos II, the regiment, like the senior , was split in two units, one for the West and one for the East, each headed by a respective domestic. The subaltern domestic of the Excubitors may either by a copyist error, or, according to Vera von Falkenhausen, indicate a subordinate official in charge of Excubitors stationed in the provinces; indeed such provincial detachments are attested, albeit only for the themes of Longobardia in southern Italy and of Hellas in Greece.

Other officers
The fact that the unit did not partake in campaigns during the 7th century preserved it from the reforms that affected the field army during this period, so that the late antique terminology for its junior officers remained relatively intact. He may have commanded provincial detachments of the regiment, and there may have been more than one  at the same time, for each of these detachments.

Strength
Other scholars, most prominently John Haldon, based on a more conservative reading of sources, have provided estimates of around 1,000 men for each .

Known commanders of the Excubitors

Notes

References

Sources

Further reading

 

Military units and formations established in the 5th century
Guards units of the Byzantine Empire
Late Roman military units
460s establishments
1080s disestablishments